Anglès is a surname. Notable people with the surname include:
 Jules Anglès (1778–1828), French politician
 Pep Anglès (born 1993), Spanish golfer
 Raoul Anglès (1887–1967), French politician